Giselbert II (died 1102) was the count of Roussillon from the death of his father, Gausfred II, in 1074 until his own death. His mother was Adelaide.

In 1040, he participated in his father's sack of Ampurias. He himself had a peace treaty with Ponç I of Ampurias from 1075 to 1085.

He married Estefania and was succeeded by his son Girard.

External links
Image of knights rendering homage to Giselbert, from the Liber feudorum Ceritaniae.

1102 deaths
Year of birth unknown
11th-century Visigothic people